Saint Clement's Church, Lowlands, is an Anglican church located in the parish of Saint Lucy in Barbados.The Priest in Charge is the Rev. Keith Griffith.

External links
St Clement's Church, Lowlands, St Lucy, Barbados
St Clement's Church  

Churches in Barbados
Saint Lucy, Barbados
Anglican church buildings in North America